Tessaracoccus rhinocerotis is a Gram-positive, non-spore-forming, facultatively anaerobic and non-motile bacterium from the genus Tessaracoccus which has been isolated from the faeces of the rhino (Rhinoceros unicornis) from the Yunnan Wild Animal Park in China.

References 

Propionibacteriales
Bacteria described in 2016